The Pioneer Sessions is a compilation album by William Beckett containing acoustic versions of songs from his previous three EPs.  It was released on January 22, 2013, under YIKE Records.

Track listing 

2013 compilation albums
William Beckett (singer) albums